The 65th Golden Globe Awards, honoring the best in film and television of 2007, were presented by the Hollywood Foreign Press Association on January 13, 2008.

Due to threats of boycotts and picketing of the event due to the then-ongoing Writers Guild of America strike, the traditional awards ceremony did not take place; instead, the winners were announced in a press conference at The Beverly Hilton. The ceremony's usual broadcaster NBC carried alternate programming hosted by Billy Bush and Nancy O'Dell of Access Hollywood, including an hour-long results special.

The nominees were announced on December 13, 2007. The television film Longford was the most-awarded, with three awards including Best Miniseries or Television Movie. The film Atonement entered the Golden Globes with the most nominations, and won the awards for best drama film and original score. It was tied for the most-awarded film with The Diving Bell and the Butterfly (best foreign language film, and best director for Julian Schnabel), No Country for Old Men (best screenplay, and best performance by a supporting actor for Javier Bardem), and Sweeney Todd (winner of best musical or comedy film, and best performance in a musical or comedy film for Johnny Depp) — which all received two.

Ceremony cancellation 
The Association attempted to reach an interim agreement with the Writers Guild to allow its members to write for the ceremonies. When a compromise fell through, striking writers threatened to picket the event; almost all of the celebrities planning to attend, including members of the Screen Actors Guild who pledged their support for the strike, promised to boycott the ceremony rather than cross the picket lines. On January 8, 2008, the HFPA chose to cancel the ceremony, and replace it with a press conference at the Beverly Hilton Hotel, held on January 13, 2008, at 6:00 p.m. PT.

NBC initially announced plans to be the exclusive broadcaster of the press conference, with its coverage hosted by Billy Bush and Nancy O'Dell of the NBC-syndicated entertainment news program Access Hollywood. However, the network balked after Dick Clark Productions—who normally produces the ceremony and telecast—reportedly demanded that the network pay an additional "license fee" between $1.5 and $2 million for the privilege. DCP defended the allegations, having stated that it was inappropriate for NBC to hold "an exclusive three-hour broadcast special disguised as a news conference that would bar all other media" without paying the HFPA and DCP a "nominal license fee". There were also reports that NBC came into conflicts with the HFPA over the presentation of the event, centering upon the involvement of Access Hollywood.

Due to the conflict, the HFPA took full control over the press conference, and announced that it would not impose any restrictions on who may televise it. E! and TV Guide Network—two cable channels known for their red carpet coverage during awards season—both carried the press conference, but also reduced the extent of their overall coverage due to the lack of ceremony. TV Guide Network aired a two-hour pre-show and a one-hour post-show, anchored by Chris Harrison and Maria Sansone from the network's studio, as opposed to its traditional red carpet coverage hosted by Lisa Rinna and Joey Fatone. E! did not broadcast Live from the Red Carpet at all, and broke into a marathon of Keeping Up with the Kardashians for live coverage of the press conference.

NBC did not air the official, 32-minute press conference, and instead presented the results over the course of an hour-long NBC News special hosted by Bush and O'Dell from the Access Hollywood studio. The results program was preceded by a two-hour Dateline special hosted by Matt Lauer, Going for Gold, which featured interviews with the nominees, and guest predictions from comedian Kathy Griffin and the Football Night in America panel. The results show was followed by an Access Hollywood special, where Bush and O'Dell visited the sites of the cancelled after-parties.

Rob Owen of the Pittsburgh Post-Gazette felt that NBC's resulting programming was an "over-produced mess", and that one could have learned the results quicker by watching the roughly half-hour press conference on CNN, E!, or TV Guide Network instead (as opposed to NBC's hour-long program with commercial breaks, whose results were increasingly delayed from the actual announcements). He also noted that TV Guide Network's pre-show had a stronger focus on the impact of the WGA strike on the show and the entertainment industry. By contrast, Owen described the aforementioned Dateline special as "sort of a long, drawn-out 'Barbara Walters Special' without the soft-focus, tears or 'What kind of a tree would you be?' questions", and sarcastically acknowledged its inclusion of analysis from "noted film critics" Tiki Barber, Jerome Bettis and Cris Collinsworth.

Winners and nominees

These are the nominees for the 65th Golden Globe Awards. Winners are listed at the top of each list.

Film

Television

Award breakdown
The following films and programs received multiple nominations:

Film

Television 

The following films and programs received multiple wins:

Film

Television

See also

 80th Academy Awards
 28th Golden Raspberry Awards
 14th Screen Actors Guild Awards
 59th Primetime Emmy Awards
 60th Primetime Emmy Awards
 61st British Academy Film Awards
 62nd Tony Awards
 2007 in film
 2007 in American television

References

External links

065
2007 film awards
2007 television awards
January 2008 events in the United States
Golden